S-Bhf. Berlin Feuerbachstraße is a railway station in the Steglitz locality of Berlin, Germany. It is served by the Berlin S-Bahn and several local bus lines.

The station was opened on 15 May 1933 as part of the electrification of the Wannseebahn suburban line.

External links

Station information

References

 

Berlin S-Bahn stations
Railway stations in Berlin
Buildings and structures in Steglitz-Zehlendorf
Railway stations in Germany opened in 1933